Korawich Tasa (born 7 April 2000) is a Thai professional footballer who plays as a forward, he has also been used as a winger for Thai League 1 club BG Pathum United.

International career
In July 2015, he won the 2015 AFF U-16 Youth Championship with Thailand U16.

International goals

U23

U19

Honours

International
Thailand U-16
 AFF U-16 Youth Championship winners: 2015

Thailand U-23
 AFF U-22 Youth Championship runners up: 2019
 Southeast Asian Games  Silver medal: 2021

References

External links
 

2000 births
Living people
Korawich Tasa
Korawich Tasa
Association football forwards
Korawich Tasa
Korawich Tasa
Korawich Tasa
Korawich Tasa
Korawich Tasa
Competitors at the 2021 Southeast Asian Games
Korawich Tasa